A funnel is a pipe with a wide mouth, good for feeding, often conical mouth and a narrow stem.

Funnel may also refer to:
 Funnel (ship)
 Funnel (concurrent computing)
 Purchase funnel (sales and marketing)
 Conversion funnel (web analytics)
 Funnels, fictional drone units in the fictional Universal Century timeline of the Gundam Franchise.

See also
Funneling (disambiguation)
Funnel cake, a fried batter desert
Funnel chart
Funnel cloud